Glanegg is a town in the district of Feldkirchen in Carinthia in Austria.

Geography
Glanegg lies in the Glan valley between Sankt Veit and Feldkirchen.

Neighboring municipalities

References

Cities and towns in Feldkirchen District